The Wöllmer Type Foundry was founded by black-letter and script type designer Wilhelm Wöllmer.  Wöllmer was first assistant in the commercial type foundry of Eduard Haenel.  Wöllmer founded his own company in 1854 in Berlin as a commercial printing business.  Ten years later, in 1864, he supplemented the business by opening a type foundry which remained in operation until 1938.

Typefaces

References

Letterpress font foundries of Germany
Manufacturing companies based in Berlin
Companies of Prussia